The Romanian (Greek) Catholic Eparchy of (Saint Basil the Great of) Bucharest (Romanian Sfântul Vasile cel Mare de București) is an eparchy of the Romanian Greek Catholic Church (Byzantine Rite in Romanian language). It is a suffragan of Romanian Greek Catholic Archdiocese of Făgăraș and Alba Iulia, which is the Major-Archbishopric of the Romanian Catholic particular church sui iuris.

The episcopal see is the cathedral of Saint Basil the Great (Sfântul Vasile cel Mare) in the Romanian capital Bucharest.

History 
The eparchy was erected on 29 May by Major Archbishop Lucian Cardinal Mureșan on territory split off from the Romanian Catholic Archdiocese of Făgăraş and Alba Iulia with the consent of the synod of the Romanian Catholic Church and the Holy See.

Extent 
The jurisdiction of the eparchy comprises all Catholics of the Romanian Catholic Church residing within Bucharest and the historical regions of Dobruja, Muntenia and Oltenia. The territory was taken from the Archdiocese of Făgăraş and Alba Iulia.

Episcopal ordinaries
''(all Byzantine Rite)
 Mihai Frățilă (29 May 2014 – ...), previously Titular Bishop of Novæ (2007.10.27 – 2014.05.29) & Auxiliary Bishop of Făgăraş şi Alba Iulia of the Romanians (Romania) (2007.10.27 – 2014.05.29)

References

Sources and external links
 Official website
 Info on GigaCatholic

Bucharest
Bucharest
Bucharest
Christian organizations established in 2014
2014 establishments in Romania